Jenna Street (born July 3, 1982) is an American former competition swimmer who won a bronze medal in the 200-meter breaststroke event at the 1998 World Aquatics Championships.

She was born in Johnson City, Tennessee, but then moved to Jacksonville, Florida. She attended the Bolles School and the University of Florida.

References

1982 births
Living people
American female breaststroke swimmers
People from Johnson City, Tennessee
World Aquatics Championships medalists in swimming
21st-century American women